Talaskara Ridge (‘Rid Talaskara’ \'rid ta-la-'ska-ra\) is the ice-covered ridge extending 7.5 km in southeast–northwest direction and 1.8 km wide, rising to 1122 m (central height) and 1201 m (south height) on the northwest side of Rouen Mountains in northern Alexander Island, Antarctica.  It surmounts Bongrain Ice Piedmont to the west and southwest.  The vicinity was visited on 6 January 1988 by the geological survey party of Christo Pimpirev and Borislav Kamenov (First Bulgarian Antarctic Expedition), and Philip Nell and Peter Marquis (British Antarctic Survey).

The feature is named after the ancient Thracian fortress of Talaskara in Southeastern Bulgaria.

Location

Maps
 British Antarctic Territory.  Scale 1:250000 topographic map.  Sheet SR19-20/5.  APC UK, 1991
 Antarctic Digital Database (ADD). Scale 1:250000 topographic map of Antarctica. Scientific Committee on Antarctic Research (SCAR). Since 1993, regularly upgraded and updated

Notes

References
 Bulgarian Antarctic Gazetteer. Antarctic Place-names Commission. (details in Bulgarian, basic data in English)
 Talaskara Ridge. SCAR Composite Gazetteer of Antarctica

External links
 Talaskara Ridge. Copernix satellite image

Ridges of Alexander Island
Bulgaria and the Antarctic